Kyle Young (born January 5, 1998) is an American former  basketball player. He played college basketball for the Ohio State Buckeyes of the Big Ten Conference.

Early life and high school career
Young was raised in Massillon, Ohio and went to high school at the nearby Jackson High School. In 2020, while at Ohio State, Young was named the Stark County High School Player of the Decade.

Recruiting
Young originally committed to Butler under head coach Chris Holtmann on August 29, 2016. After Holtmann left Butler to accept the head coaching position at Ohio State, Young decommitted from Butler and committed to Ohio State on June 19, 2017, over Butler, Akron, and Clemson.

College career
Young came off the bench during his freshman year, playing in 25 games and averaging 1.8 points and 1.6 rebounds per game.

He started 14 out of 31 games during his sophomore season, averaging 6 points and 4.4 rebounds per game. His best game of the season came against UCLA on December 22, 2018. He scored 11 points and pulled down 6 rebounds. He missed four games due to a stress fracture in his leg.

During his junior season, he became a full-time starter at power forward. He, alongside center Kaleb Wesson, were the bigs of the team. He started all 25 games he played in, averaging 7.5 points and 5.8 rebounds per game. He missed two games due to needing surgery to get his appendix removed. He also missed a few games due to a high ankle sprain. He scored a career-high 16 points and grabbed 7 rebounds against Purdue on February 15, 2020.

As a senior, Young averaged 8.6 points, 5.5 rebounds, 1.3 assists and .6 blocks per game. Following the season, he announced he was taking advantage of the additional season of eligibility granted by the NCAA due to the COVID-19 pandemic.

In his final season, he became Ohio State's sixth man with the emergence of fellow power forward Zed Key and averaged 8.2 points, 5 rebounds, 1.2 assists, and .6 blocks per game. Instead of declaring for the 2022 NBA draft and trying to start a professional career, he opted to retire from basketball on May 12, 2022.

Career statistics

College

|-
| style="text-align:left;"| 2017–18
| style="text-align:left;"| Ohio State
| 25 || 0 || 8.6 || .442 || .100 || .455 || 1.6 || .2 || .3 || .1 || 1.8
|-
| style="text-align:left;"| 2018–19
| style="text-align:left;"| Ohio State
| 31 || 14 || 20.5 || .672 || .167 || .583 || 4.4 || .9 || .5 || .5 || 6.0
|-
| style="text-align:left;"| 2019–20
| style="text-align:left;"| Ohio State
| 25 || 25 || 22.9 || .585 || .154 || .656 || 5.8 || .9 || .3 || .5 || 7.5
|-
| style="text-align:left;"| 2020–21
| style="text-align:left;"| Ohio State
| 27 || 26 || 26.3 || .543 || .433 || .846 || 5.5 || 1.3 || .4 || .6 || 8.6
|-
| style="text-align:left;"| 2021–22
| style="text-align:left;"| Ohio State
| 27 || 4 || 22.7 || .500 || .294 || .788 || 5.0 || 1.2 || .5 || .6 || 8.2
|- class="sortbottom"
| style="text-align:center;" colspan="2"| Career
| 135 || 69 || 20.4 || .559 || .291 || .710 || 4.5 || .9 || .4 || .5 || 6.5

Personal life
Young has a brother, Mark Young Jr., who also played basketball at Jackson and Malone, a college in Ohio. His father, Mark Sr., played high school basketball at Hoover High School, which is close to Jackson. Mark Sr. died by suicide on October 26, 2015, after a 28-year battle with multiple sclerosis.

References

External links
Ohio State Buckeyes bio

1998 births
Living people
American men's basketball players
Ohio State Buckeyes men's basketball players
Sportspeople from Massillon, Ohio
Power forwards (basketball)